Martti Kuusela (born 9 October 1945) is a Finnish football manager and former midfielder.

Kuusela enjoyed a moderately successful career as a player in Finland. As a coach, he won the Finnish championship in 1981 and 1990 with HJK Helsinki. He was the head coach of the Finnish national team from 1982 to 1987, helping the team to the brink of qualifying for the 1986 World Cup.

Kuusela has worked as coach in Belgium, Greece, Cyprus, Denmark and Hungary. He led Budapest Honvéd FC to the Hungarian championship in 1993. Kuusela coached Aris Thessaloniki F.C. in Greece in 2005. On 15 January 2008, TPS announced they had appointed Kuusela as their new manager. He took the reins at TPS when the previous manager Mixu Paatelainen left the club to become manager of Scottish club Hibernian. Kuusela was sacked by TPS in September 2008, a few weeks before the end of the season. Kuusela also works as an expert commentator for Yle.

References

External links

Career

1945 births
Living people
People from Rovaniemi
Finnish footballers
Finland international footballers
Finnish football managers
FC Haka players
Helsingin Jalkapalloklubi players
Budapest Honvéd FC managers
Apollon Limassol FC managers
Expatriate football managers in Denmark
Expatriate football managers in Belgium
Expatriate football managers in Hungary
Expatriate football managers in Greece
Expatriate football managers in Cyprus
Aris Thessaloniki F.C. managers
Finland national football team managers
Helsingin Jalkapalloklubi managers
Panionios F.C. managers
TPS Turku football managers
Proodeftiki F.C. managers
FinnPa managers
Association football midfielders
Finnish expatriate sportspeople in Greece
Finnish expatriate sportspeople in Belgium
Finnish expatriate sportspeople in Hungary
Finnish expatriate sportspeople in Cyprus
Finnish expatriate sportspeople in Denmark
Finnish expatriate football managers
Nemzeti Bajnokság I managers
Sportspeople from Lapland (Finland)